Tai McIsaac (born 19 March 1975, in Brisbane) is an Australian rugby union football coach, and a former professional player. He is currently the head coach of the Perth Spirit team in Australia's National Rugby Championship. McIsaac played as a hooker for the Western Force and Queensland Reds in the Super Rugby competition before retiring from playing in 2009.

Career
Prior to rugby, McIsaac had been a National League water polo player and represented Australian water polo in the under-21 team. Although he eventually specialised as a hooker, McIsaac started out in rugby at the age of 23, playing as a prop. He began his rugby career at Bond Pirates in the Gold Coast District Rugby Union, later moving on to the Gold Coast Breakers in Queensland Premier Rugby. McIsaac's first professional contract was with the Queensland Reds in the Super 12 competition. He made his Super 12 debut in 2003 in a match against New Zealand team, the Crusaders. Also that year, McIsaac toured Japan with Australia A.

In 2005, he signed with the Western Force for their inaugural season in 2006. McIsaac made his debut for the Wallabies against England in  2006, and went on to claim 8 Test caps in that season. After four seasons at the Force, he retired from playing rugby in 2009.

McIsaac began his coaching career with Honda Heat in Japan for the 2009–10 season. McIsaac was head coach of the Toyota Industries Shuttles for several seasons until 2013–14. He then returned to Australia to take  up an assistant coaching position at the Western Force in 2015. He was also appointed head coach of the Perth Spirit for the 2015 season of the National Rugby Championship.

References

External links

1975 births
Australian rugby union coaches
Australian rugby union players
Australia international rugby union players
Living people
Rugby union hookers
Rugby union players from Brisbane